Joint Region Marianas' mission is to provide installation management support
to all Department of Defense components and tenants through assigned
regional installations on Guam and the Northern Mariana Islands in support
of training in the Marianas; to act as the interface between the Department
of Defense and the civilian community; to ensure compliance with all
environmental laws and regulations, safety procedures, and equal opportunity
policy; and perform other functions and tasks as may be assigned.

History 
JRM was established by congressional legislation implementing the
recommendations of the 2005 Base Realignment and Closure Commission. The
legislation ordered the consolidation of facilities which were adjoining,
but separate military installations, into a single joint base, one of 12
formed in the United States as a result of the law.

On February 6, 2009, the Navy and Air Force held a groundbreaking ceremony
for a combined headquarters at Nimitz Hill Annex. Joint Region Marianas
began initial operational capability on January 31, 2009, and reached full
operational capability on October 1, 2009. 

A 2006 International Agreement between the US Government and the Government
of Japan directed a significant reduction in the number of Marines on
Okinawa. As part of that drawdown, the establishment of a Marine Corps Base
Guam was planned. In 2018, the Secretary of the Navy approved the renaming
of Marine Corps Base Guam in honor of the late Brigadier General Blaz. On 30
September 2020 the new base was activated as Marine Corps Base Camp Blaz.
Installation management support is being provided under Joint Region
Marianas. (MCBUL 5400 dtd 25FEB2020)

Under an agreement signed in November 2020, some installation support
functions were returned to Air Force to allow higher funding levels to meet
operational requirements. The agreement takes full effect on 1 October 2021.

Under Joint Region Marianas, Naval Base Guam (NBG), Andersen Air Force Base (AAFB) and Marine Corps Base Camp Blaz (MCB-CB) each maintain commanding
officers, who will oversee their respective mission requirements and
operations. Joint Region Marianas will oversee support services, policies,
and resources for Navy and Marine Corps bases and some functions on AAFB.
Air Force provides some support services to all Department of Defense
components and tenants located on AAFB. Joint Region Marianas is located on
Nimitz Hill between Naval Base Guam and Andersen AFB.

The commander of Joint Region Marianas also serves as Commander Naval Forces
Marianas and as U.S. Defense Representative to Guam, Commonwealth of the
Northern Mariana Islands, Republic of Palau, and Federated States of
Micronesia.

Supported installations

Naval Base Guam 

The main base of USNB Guam, sometimes called "Big Navy" is located south of Outer Apra Harbor in Santa Rita, mostly on the Orote Peninsula. Big Navy is home of Commander Submarine Squadron 15, Coast Guard Sector Guam, and Naval Special Warfare Unit Det Guam and supports 28 other tenant commands.  

It is the home base of dozens of Pacific Command, United States Pacific Fleet, and Seventh Fleet units.

Other components falling under Naval Base Guam include:
 Naval Base Guam Barrigada 
 Ordnance Annex, formerly known as Naval Magazine, in the south central part of Guam
 Defense Fuel Support Point Guam, with fuel facilities at Tenjo Valley and Sasa Valley in Piti

Andersen Air Force Base 

Andersen AFB is one of four bomber forward operating locations in the air force. Andersen is one of two bases in the Asia Pacific region with forward-deployed bomber beddown support, the other being Diego Garcia.

Marine Corps Base Camp Blaz 

Other components falling under Marine Corps Base Camp Blaz include:
 Naval Computer and Telecommunications Station Guam (NCTS)
 DoD Andersen AFB Andy South is a military base in Mangilao
 South Finegayan
 Live Fire Training Ranges

Units
Andersen AFB is hosted by the 36th Wing. It has the following tenant units:
 497th Combat Training Squadron
 624th Regional Support Group
 Detachment 1, 69th Reconnaissance Group
 734th Air Mobility Support Squadron, under Air Mobility Command
 Detachment 5, 22nd Space Operations Squadron
 Detachment 602, United States Air Force Office of Special Investigations
 Helicopter Sea Combat Squadron 25 of the U.S. Navy
 254th Air Base Group of the Guam Air National Guard
 337th Air Support Flight, manages USAF Pacific Personnel Exchange Program to Australia
 United States Department of Agriculture facility
 Task Force Talon, 94th Army Air and Missile Defense Command, a Terminal High Altitude Area Defense unit of the U.S. Army

Other 
 United States Naval Hospital Guam in Agana Heights, Guam
 South Finegayan, a housing facility in Dededo
 Andersen South, a large parcel that formerly housed Marine Barracks Guam in Yigo
 Nimitz Hill, a housing facility in Asan
 Northwest Field at the northern tip of Guam in Dededo and Yigo
 North Field on Tinian, CNMI
 Farallon de Medinilla, a CNMI island used as a bombing range
 Pagan (proposed), an island in the CNMI proposed for a training range

References

External links

Official Website
Official website

Joint bases of the U.S. Department of Defense
Military installations of the United States in Guam
1999 establishments in Guam